Bizjan-e Olya (also Romanized as Bīzjān-e ‘Olyā; also known as Bīzjān) is a village in Ramjerd-e Do Rural District, Dorudzan District, Marvdasht County, Fars Province, Iran. At the 2006 census, its population was 348, in 80 families.

References 

Populated places in Marvdasht County